Foxes' Oven is a novel by the English writer Michael de Larrabeiti. It is set in the village of Offham near Arundel in West Sussex in 1940. It was published by Robert Hale in 2003.

External links
 Free PDF of the first chapter of Foxes' Oven

References

2003 British novels
Novels by Michael de Larrabeiti
Fiction set in 1940
Novels set in Sussex
Novels set during World War II
Robert Hale books